Cable Regime was a British industrial rock and noise band that existed between 1988 and 1997. Cable Regime released three albums, two EPs, a 12" single, and was included on various compilation albums. Its final album, Cable Regime, was released in 2000. Paul Neville was a member of the band Godflesh, and Diarmuid Dalton is an occasional member of the band Jesu.

Discography
"Assimilate & Destroy" (CD, Maxi) – 1992
"Life In The House Of The Enemy" (CD) – 1992
"Dance Trilogy" (CD, Maxi) – 1993
Kill Lies All (CD) – 1993
"King Of Beers" (12" single) – 1993
Brave New World (CD, Maxi) – 1995
Cable Regime (CD) – 2000
Mortar (Various Artists) – Cable Regime – Cop Shoot Cop – Nox – Caspar Brötzmann – Massaker – Gore / Hoer – Fall of Because – Grill (digital publishing) – 2014

Members
Paul Neville – guitars and vocals
Steve Hough – guitars
Diarmuid Dalton – bass

External links
 Mortar – Various Artists
 Cable Regime at Discogs

English heavy metal musical groups
British industrial music groups
British industrial metal musical groups
British musical trios